Sandworm may refer to:

Living animals
 Arenicola marina (Lugworm), called "sandworm" in the UK
 Alitta virens, formerly Nereis virens (King Ragworm), called "sandworm" in the US
 Hookworm larvae which cause cutaneous larva migrans, called "sandworms" in the southern US

Fictional animals
 Sandworm (Dune), from Frank Herbert's 1965 science fiction novel Dune and its derivative works.
 When Barbara and Adam Maitland die, they come across a sandworm creature that lives on the desert of Saturn in the 1988 Tim Burton film Beetlejuice.

Other
 Sandworm (installation), an environmental art installation in the Wenduine Beach, Belgium created for the Beaufort Triennial of Contemporary Art
 Mongolian death worm, said to inhabit the Gobi Desert
 Sandworm, a hacker group within the GRU (G.U.), a foreign military intelligence agency of the Russian Federation
Sandworm: A New Era of Cyberwar and the Hunt for the Kremlin's Most Dangerous Hackers (2019), a book about the group by Andy Greenberg

Animal common name disambiguation pages